Crantor (gen.: Κράντορος; died 276/5 BC) was a Greek philosopher and scholarch (leader) of the Old Academy, probably born around the middle of the 4th century BC, at Soli in Cilicia (modern-day Turkey).

Life
Crantor moved to Athens in order to study philosophy, where he became a pupil of Xenocrates and a friend of Polemon, and one of the most distinguished supporters of the philosophy of the older Academy. As Xenocrates died 314/3 BC, Crantor must have come to Athens prior to that year, although the date of his birth is not known. He died before Polemon and Crates.  Dropsy was the cause of his death. He left his fortune, which amounted to twelve talents, to Arcesilaus  who succeeded him as scholarch of the Academy.

Writings
Crantor was the first of Plato's followers who wrote commentaries on the works of his master. He also made some attempts at poetry; and Diogenes Laërtius relates, that, after sealing up a collection of his poems, he deposited them in the temple of Athena in his native city, Soli. He is accordingly called by the poet Theaetetus, in an epitaph which he composed upon him, the friend of the Muses; and that his chief favourites among the poets were Homer and Euripides.

His works were very numerous. Diogenes Laërtius says that he left behind Commentaries, which consisted of 30,000 lines; but of these only fragments have been preserved. They appear to have related principally to moral subjects, and, accordingly, Horace classes him with Chrysippus as a moral philosopher, and speaks of him in a manner which proves that the writings of Crantor were much read and generally known in Rome at that time.

The most popular of Crantor's works in Rome seems to have been that "On Grief", which was addressed to his friend Hippocles on the death of his son, and from which Cicero seems to have heavily relied upon in his Tusculan Disputations. The Stoic philosopher Panaetius called it a "golden" work, which deserved to be learnt by heart word for word. Cicero also made great use of it while writing his celebrated Consolatio on the death of his daughter, Tullia. Several extracts from it are preserved in Pseudo-Plutarch's treatise on Consolation addressed to Apollonius, which has come down to us. Crantor paid special attention to ethics, and arranged "good" things in the following order - virtue, health, pleasure, riches.

Notes

Sources

Attribution:

4th-century BC Greek people
4th-century BC philosophers
Academic philosophers
Ancient Greek ethicists
Commentators on Plato
Deaths from edema
Year of birth unknown
270s BC deaths